Country Code: +299International Call Prefix: 00

Calling formats
To call in Greenland, the following format is used:

yy xx xx      Calls inside Greenland

+299 yy xx xx  Calls from outside Greenland

00              International Direct Dialing code

List of area codes in Greenland
Mobile phone numbers are allocated numbers 21 xxxx – 29 xxxx, 42 xxxx – 49 xxxx and 51 xxxx – 59 xxxx.
Landline numbers start with 3 (Nuuk), 6 (South Greenland), 8 (West) or 9 (North and East).

References

External links
https://travel.state.gov/travel/cis_pa_tw/cis/cis_1100.html
https://web.archive.org/web/20090201120828/http://denmark.usembassy.gov/living-in-denmark.html

Greenland
Communications in Greenland